Borger-Odoorn is a municipality in the northeastern Netherlands in the province of Drenthe. 

The local Hunebedcentrum Borger features several megaliths (or 'hunebeds') associated with the neolithic and mesolithic Funnelbeaker culture, as well as recreations of historical houses.

Population centers

Topography

Dutch Topographic map of the municipality of Borger-Odoorn, June 2015.

Notable people 

 Albert Meems (1888 in Nieuw-Buinen – after 1957) a Dutch spy for Germany in the Second World War
 Pieter van Boven (1898 – 1952) a Dutch fencer, competed at the 1924 Summer Olympics
 Egbert Schuurman (born 1937 in Borger) a Dutch engineer, philosopher and politician
 Henk Nienhuis (1941 in Nieuw-Buinen – 2017) a Dutch footballer and manager. 
 Henk G. Sol (born 1951 in Borger) a Dutch organizational theorist and academic
 Carsten de Dreu (born 1966 in Borger) Professor of Psychology at Leiden University and Behavioral Economics at the University of Amsterdam

Twin towns 
The municipality has a partner city

Gallery

References

External links
Official website

 
Municipalities of Drenthe
Municipalities of the Netherlands established in 1998